Konstantinos Skarlatos (17 March 1872 – 1969) was a Hellenic Army officer who reached the rank of Lieutenant General. He also competed in the 1906 Summer Olympics and in the 1912 Summer Olympics as a sport shooter.

Military career 
He was born in 1872 at Vitolitsa near Nafpaktos. He entered the Hellenic Military Academy and graduated in July 1892 as an artillery second lieutenant. He fought in the Greco-Turkish War of 1897, the Balkan Wars and the Asia Minor Campaign. In 1921–1922, he served as Commander of the Military Academy, and retired with the rank of lieutenant general.

Olympic record

1906 Athens
In the 1906 Summer Olympics he participated in the following events:

 30 m duelling pistol - first place
 20 m duelling pistol - fourth place
 50 m pistol - fourth place
 25 m rapid fire pistol - 15th place
 20 m army pistol (1873 model) - 17th place

1912 Stockholm
Six years later at the 1912 Summer Olympics he participated in the following events:

 Team 50 metre military pistol - fifth place
 Team 30 metre military pistol - fifth place
 30 metre rapid fire pistol - 27th place
 50 metre pistol - 30th place

References

1872 births
1969 deaths
Greek male sport shooters
ISSF pistol shooters
Olympic shooters of Greece
Shooters at the 1906 Intercalated Games
Shooters at the 1912 Summer Olympics
People from Aetolia-Acarnania
Hellenic Army lieutenant generals
Greek military personnel of the Balkan Wars
Greek military personnel of the Greco-Turkish War (1897)
Greek military personnel of the Greco-Turkish War (1919–1922)
Olympic gold medalists for Greece
Olympic medalists in shooting
Medalists at the 1906 Intercalated Games
Sportspeople from Western Greece